"White Is in the Winter Night" is a promotional single by Irish musician Enya, the second to be taken from the album And Winter Came.... Enya performed the song on Live! with Regis and Kelly.

Track listing
Promo CD
 "White Is in the Winter Night" – 3:00

Charts

References

External links
White is in the Winter Night song details

Enya songs
2008 singles
2008 songs
Reprise Records singles
Songs with music by Enya
Songs with lyrics by Roma Ryan